Leif Gøran Jenssen (born 19 March 1948) is a former Norwegian weightlifter. He became Olympic Champion in 1972 in the light-heavyweight class.  He obtained silver medal three times in the World Championships, in 1970s, 1971 and 1974. Jenssen was elected Norwegian Sportsperson of the Year 1971.

Until January 1973 use of anabolic steroids was not prohibited. Jenssen has been open about his use of steroids until the ban, including during the 1972 Olympics. He started using methandrostenolone prescribed by his general practitioner in 1970. He stated that he has no bad conscience about the use, as he estimates that 49 of 50 of the world's best weightlifters used steroids at the time. He regards it as impossible to have won the Olympic medal without use of the performance-enhancing drugs, but has stated that he believes that if no-one had used them, including himself, he would still have won.

References

External links

1948 births
Norwegian male weightlifters
Doping cases in weightlifting
Norwegian sportspeople in doping cases
Weightlifters at the 1968 Summer Olympics
Weightlifters at the 1972 Summer Olympics
Weightlifters at the 1976 Summer Olympics
Olympic gold medalists for Norway
Living people
Olympic medalists in weightlifting
Medalists at the 1972 Summer Olympics
World Weightlifting Championships medalists
Sportspeople from Fredrikstad
20th-century Norwegian people